Are Parents People? is a 1925 American silent comedy film starring Betty Bronson, Florence Vidor, Adolphe Menjou, George Beranger, and Lawrence Gray. The film was directed by Malcolm St. Clair and released by Paramount Pictures.

Plot
As described in a film magazine review, Lita's parents are the victims of a divorce due to incompatibility and each want her to accompany them to Europe or Nevada. Lita, however, learns from the young Doctor Dacer, who seems interested in Lisa, that her parents are still in love with each other. She takes the blame of a girl friend at the boarding school, who is believed to have had an affair with "movie sheik" actor Maurice Mansfield, and is expelled. Her parents become so interested in her welfare that now have a mutual interest and become reconciled. The parents then learn that Lita was expelled for an other young woman's mischief.

Cast

Preservation
According to the SilentEra website, the film survives in a 16mm print.

Home media
The film was released on DVD on June 21, 2011.

References

External links

Stills at silenthollywood.com
Still at silentfilmstillarchive.com
Review at moviessilently.com
 (9 minute excerpt)

1925 films
American silent feature films
Films directed by Malcolm St. Clair
Paramount Pictures films
Silent American comedy films
1926 comedy films
1926 films
American black-and-white films
Films based on works by Alice Duer Miller
1925 comedy films
Films based on American novels
1920s American films